This is an incomplete list of notable people that are regarded as being of Cantonese origin:

Historical 
 Liu Yan, king of Nanhai and first emperor of the Yue/Han kingdom between 917–971
 Yuan Chonghuan, Ming dynasty general and patriot famed for defeating Qing dynasty rulers and founder Nurchaci and Hong Taiji
 Liang Daoming, king of Palembang during the Ming dynasty.
 Chow Ah Chi, a Toi San Cantonese was Sir Raffles ship's carpenter who landed first and led the way in posting the East India Company's flag on Singapore Island. 
 Ching Shih, worlds successful pirate and one of the world's most powerful pirates; she challenged the British empire, Portuguese empire, and Qing dynasty and was undefeated.[34][35]
 Cheng I, pirate and husband of Ching Shih
 Ah Pak, pirate chieftain who defeated Portuguese pirates
 Liu Chang, the last emperor of the Southern Han Kingdom
 Luo Sen, interpreter that assisted translations for American Commodore Mathew Perry in opening up Japan
 Sun Yat-sen, born in Zhongshan, Guangdong. Chinese revolutionary and founder of the Republic of China. Sun's father was Cantonese, while mother a cantonese 
 Deng Shichang, admiral and one of the first modern naval officers in China in the late Qing dynasty
 Tse Tsan-tai, early Chinese revolutionary of the late Qing Dynasty
 Kang Youwei was a Chinese scholar, noted calligrapher and prominent political thinker and reformer of the late Qing dynasty.
 Liang Qichao was a Chinese scholar, journalist, philosopher, and reformist who lived during the Qing dynasty and Republic of China.
 Sun Ke, born in Xiangshan (now Zhongshan), Guangdong. Premier of the Republic of China, 1932, 1948–1949
 Henry Lee Hau Shik, first Finance Minister of the Federation of Malaya and only Chinese signatory of the Malayan independence agreement with Britain.[36]
 Jiang Guangnai, general and statesman in the Republic of China and the People's Republic of China who successfully defended Shanghai City from the Japanese invasion in the 28 January Incident of 1932

Actors and Entertainers 
Anna May Wong, the first Chinese-American and Asian female international movie star
Anita Mui, singer and actress, dubbed as the "Madonna of the East".
James Wong Howe, leading Hollywood cinematographer in the 1930s–40s and ten-time Academy Award nominee
Lai Man-Wai, the father of Hong Kong cinema
Stephen Chow, His grandfather is from Ningbo but his mother is Cantonese. He is actor and film director known for the comedy blockbusters Shaolin Soccer and Kung Fu Hustle
John Woo, influential film director
Tony Leung Chiu-wai, award-winning actor known for his collaborations with Wong Kar-wai, including In the Mood for Love
Andy Lau, one of Hong Kong's most commercially successful singers and actors since the mid-1980s
Gigi Lai, actress and Cantopop singer
Aaron Kwok, dancer and singer since the early 1990s
Amy Kwok, actress and Miss Hong Kong 1991
Eason Chan, well-known Cantopop singer
Rainie Yang, Taiwanese singer
Vivian Chow, Cantopop singer and actress
Fish Leong, Malaysian-Chinese singer
Kris Wu, Chinese-Canadian actor and singer, former member of K-Pop boy band EXO.
Jackson Wang, singer and member of K-Pop boy band GOT7.
Louis Koo, Hong Kong actor
Tony Leung Ka Fai, Hong Kong actor
Cheung Ka Fai, Hong Kong actor
Leo Ku, Hong Kong singer
Rui En, famous Singaporean actress
Liang Wern Fook, one of the pioneer figures in Singaporean Chinese folk songs
Yuen Woo-ping, renowned as one of the most successful and influential figures in the world of Hong Kong action cinema
Sinn Sing Hoi, one of the earliest generation of Chinese composers 
Chris Cheong, an international mentalist and illusionist. 
Terence Cao, Singaporean actor
Mark Chen, renowned Singaporean composer
Kelly Poon, Singaporean singer
Awkwafina, her mother is South Korean. American rapper, comedian, television personality, television host
Jeff Chan, Asian American tenor saxophonist and composer
Zen Chong, Malaysian actor and won supporting acting in 2009
Michael Paul Chan is an American television and film actor.
Laura Ling, American journalist and writer. Correspondent and vice president of its Vanguard Journalism Unit
Lisa Ling, American journalist, television presenter, special correspondent for The Oprah Winfrey Show
Sam Tsui, American singer/songwriter and video producer. Internet celebrity with 2.8 million subscribers on YouTube
Wong brothers, three ethnic Chinese film directors, the pioneers of the Indonesian movie industry
Lo Lieh, famous Hong Kong action star
Lü Wencheng, master of Cantonese music and Guangdong folk music
Lucas Wong, rapper and member of K-Pop boy group NCT under SM Entertainment
Warren Mok, an operatic tenor who has performed many leading roles since his European debut in 1987.
Hung Sin-nui, Master of Chinese and Cantonese opera.
Jeff Fatt, Australian musician and actor.

Politicians 
 Tang Shaoyi, Prime Minister of the Republic of China.
 Donald Tsang, Chief executive of Hong Kong
 Edmund Ho Hau Wah, Chief executive of Macau
 Fernando Chui, Chief executive of Macau
 Wu Tingfang, China's foreign minister during the Qing dynasty
 Wen Tsung-yao, politician and diplomat in the Qing dynasty and Republic of China
 Kang Tongbi was the daughter of Kang Youwei, a Chinese reformer and political figure of the late Qing dynasty and early Republican era.
 Hiram Fong, the first Asian-American and Chinese to be elected as Republican United States Senator and nominated for presidency of the United States
 John So, the first Lord Mayor of Melbourne to be directly elected by the people in 2006, and the first mayor of Asian descent
 Adrienne Clarkson, 26th Governor General of Canada, the first non-white Canadian to be appointed to the vice-regal position
 Norman Kwong, the 16th Lieutenant Governor of Alberta, Canada
 Gary Locke, first governor of a state in the Continental United States of Asian descent; the only Chinese American ever to serve as a governor
 Judy Chu, first Chinese-American woman to be elected to the United States Congress
 Julius Chan, Prime Minister of Papua New Guinea from 1980 to 1982, and from 1994 to 1997
 Lee Siew Choh, politician and medical doctor. Singapore's first Non-Constituency Member of Parliament (NCMP)
 Tan Sri Datuk Amar Stephen Kalong Ningkan was the first Chief Minister of Sarawak.
 Víctor Joy Way was the Prime Minister of Peru from January 1999 until December 1999. 
 José Antonio Chang Escobedo was the Prime Minister of Peru and second Chinese–Peruvian Prime Minister, the first being Víctor Joy Way.
 Peter Chin, lawyer and 56th Dunedin, New Zealand mayor
 John Yap, Canadian politician
 Meng Foon, mayor of Gisborne, New Zealand
 Alan Lowe, architect, former mayor of Victoria, British Columbia, Canada
 Ida Chong, accountant, former municipal councilor of Saanich, British Columbia, former cabinet minister/Member of Legislative Assembly of British Columbia, Canada
 Yeoh Ghim Seng, Speaker of the Parliament of Singapore from 1970 to 1989
 Chang Apana, inspirational detective with an influential law enforcement career
 Kin W. Moy American diplomat and the first ethnic Chinese to be director of the American Institute in Taiwan,  
 Carrie Lam Cheng Yuet-ngor, GBM, GBS (born 13 May 1957) is the Chief executive of Hong Kong.
 Debra Wong Yang, first Asian American woman to serve as a United States Attorney. 
 Chan Heng Chee, Singapore's Minister in Prime Minister's Office, Chief of Army from 2010 to 2011
 Chan Sek Keong,third Chief Justice of Singapore, Attorney-General of Singapore from 1992 to 2006
 Chan Kong Choy, Malaysian politician, deputy president and transport minister.
 Cheryl Chan, member of the country's governing People's Action Party (PAP),
 Sitoh Yih Pin, Singapore politician member of Parliament (MP)
 Leong Yew Koh, first Governor of Malacca since independence.
 Cheong Yoke Choy,famous and well respected philanthropist during the British Malaya era. 
 Edwin Tong, member of Parliament in Singapore representing the Marine Parade Group Representation Constituency.
 Eu Chooi Yip, prominent member of the anti-colonial and Communist movements in Malaya and Singapore 
 Ho Peng Kee, Senior Minister of State in the Ministry of Law and the Ministry of Home Affairs
 Jek Yeun Thong, prominent first generation People's Action Party (PAP) politician in Singapore
 Hoo Ah Kay, leader with many high ranking posts in Singapore, honourable consul to Japan, Russia and China.
 Kan Ting Chiu, Senior Judge in the Supreme Court. 
 Ho Yuen Hoe, Nun who received a Public Service Award from the President of Singapore
 Kin W. Moy, American diplomat. He is one of the first Chinese to hold an important position
 Datuk Patinggi Tan Sri Dr. George Chan Hong Nam, was the former Deputy Chief Minister of Sarawak. 
 Fong Chan Onn, Malaysian politician and a former Minister of Human Resources
 Fong Po Kuan, Malaysian politician from the Democratic Action Party (DAP)
 Loke Siew Fook, Member of the Parliament of Malaysia 
 Tan Chee Khoon, major figure in Malaysian politics from 1959 to 1978
 Lui Tuck Yew, country's Minister for Transport and Second Minister for Defence, Singapore's Chief of Navy from 1999 to 2003
 António Ng Kuok Cheong is currently a member in the Macau Legislative Assembly and was the founding chairman of the New Democratic Macau Association.

Athletes 
 Chen Aisen, Chinese diver. He is a double gold medal winner at the 2016 Summer Olympics and a world champion.
 Wong Peng Soon, A renowned male badminton player in the latter half of the 20th century
 Patrick Chan, A world champion Chinese-Canadian male figure skater
 Michelle Kwan, Chinese-American female figure skater and five-time world champion
 Yi Jianlian, a 7-foot-tall Chinese basketball player for NBA, Milwaukee Bucks, New Jersey Nets, and Washington Wizards
 Guan Weizhen, female badminton player who won three consecutive women's doubles titles at the BWF World Championships
 Chen Xiaomin Chinese retired weightlifter, in 2000 Sydney Olympics on the women's weightlifting gold medal, also a world and Asian champion
 Shanshan Feng, The first golfer from China to win LPGA major championship and major championship, she was ranked fifth in 2012 Women's World Golf Rankings.
 He Chong, Chinese, diver. He is the 2008 Olympic Champion gold medalist in the 3m springboard. He was unbeaten from 2006 to 2016
 Jiang Jialiang, Table Tennis player, he won medals in Asia and world table tennis tournaments.
 Xie Xingfang, Badminton player, she is a two-time world champion women's singles.
 Chen Xiexia, She won three golds at the 2007 World Weightlifting Championships. The first gold medal for China in the 2008 Summer Olympics.
 Zhang Jiewen, Gold medal in Badminton 2004 Athens
 Lao Lishi, Gold medal in women's 10-meter synchronized platform along with Li Ting.
 Su Bingtian, As a sprinter, he is the reigning Asian champion over 100 metres, was a semi-finalist at the 2012 Summer Olympics and a finalist at the 2015 World Championships.
 Liang Wen-Chong, Highest ranked golfer from the People's Republic of China, the only Chinese golfer to have reached the top 100 of the Official World Golf Ranking.
 Zeng Qiliang, the first medal of Chinese male swimmer in world championships.
Lindswell Kwok, six times world champion of Wushi
Brian Ah Yat, former American football quarterback
Harland Ah You, is a former gridiron football defensive lineman who played 10 games with the Calgary Stampeders of the Canadian Football League in 1998. 
Junior Ah You, Hall of Fame and Top 50 players of the league's modern era by Canadian sports network TSN.
Keanu Asing(urfer who competes in the World Surf League and debuted on the World Championship Tour of the 2015 World Surf League.<
Josiah Ng, Josiah was the first Malaysian to make it into the cycling Olympic finals becoming a three-time Olympian

Business 
 Raymond, Thomas, and Walter Kwok, brothers whose property business makes them the fourth richest in Hong Kong
 Stanley Ho, Hong Kong and Macanese business magnate
 Lui Che-woo, real estate and hospitality magnate, Hong Kong billionaire, once the 2nd richest man in Asia
 Cheng Yu-tung, Hong Kong billionaire
 Tang Yiu Hong Kong billionaire businessman, founder of shoe and sportswear retailer Belle International
 Mei Quong Tart, rich nineteenth-century merchant
 Charles Sew Hoy, merchant and gold-dredging pioneer
 Loke Yew, philanthropist and was once the richest man in British Malaysia
 Yaw Teck Seng was founded of Sarawak timber group, Samling.
 Chin Gee Hee, merchant and railway entrepreneur
 Lee Shau-kee, Once the 4th richest man in world, real estate tycoon and owner of Henderson Land Development
 Steven Lo, businessman and football team manager
 He Jingtang, a prominent Chinese architect for Olympic 2008
 Jimmy Lai, founder of Giordano
 Ho Ching, First Lady of Singapore
 He Xiangjian is the co-founder of Midea, one of China's largest appliance makers.
 Zhang Zhidong, a Chinese businessman, co-founder, former CTO and second-largest individual shareholder of Tencent, a Chinese internet company
 Yang Huiyan, the majority shareholder (55%) of Country Garden Holdings
 Lawrence Ho, Hong Kong businessman, chairman and CEO of Melco International, the chairman and CEO of Melco Crown Entertainment
 Ah Ken, a Chinese American businessman and popular figure in Chinatown, Manhattan 
 Dennis Fong, Fong is recognized by the Guinness Book of World Records as the first professional gamer.
 Peter Tham , A former Singaporean stockbroker and the director of Pan-Electric Industries and now a wanted criminal.
 Loke Wan Tho, He was the founder of Cathay Organisation in Singapore and Malaysia
 Eu Tong Sen, leading businessman in Malaya, Singapore and Hong Kong during the late 19th and early 20th century
 Ah Ken, Chinese American businessman and popular figure in Chinatown, Manhattan during the mid-to late 19th century.
 Kathy Chan, Chinese-American entrepreneur and investor
 Wesley Chan, early product innovator at Google Inc., best known for founding and launching Google Analytics and Google Voice
Ben Koon Wong "David, a rich businessman who Co-founded Prosperity International Holdings (H.K.) Limited and serves as its chairman. Responsible for the overall marketing, management and strategic planning. Co-founder of Prosperity Minerals Holdings Limited. He was also an ATV (Asia Television) major shareholder in 2015
 Ming Hsieh, Chinese-American businessman who founded of Cogent Systems, born in Shenyang but his parents are from Guangzhou,

Arts 
Chen Yongqiang (painter), is a China as a national level A artist and vice president of the Chinese Painting Society.
Choy Weng Yang, contributions on post-modern arts in Singapore, helped shaped the contemporary art scene in Singapore
Reagan Louie, an American photographer on sex life.
Alan Chin (photographer), contributing photographer to Newsweek and The New York Times, editor and photographer at BagNews
Bernice Bing, Chinese American lesbian artist involved in the San Francisco Bay Area art scene in the 1960s
Lee Man Fong, A painter who had successful exhibitions in Europe and Asia.
You Jin, received the Cultural Medallion Award in 2009 for her contributions to Singapore's literary arts scene.

Martial artists 
 Ip Man, martial artist and teacher of Bruce Lee.
 Wong Fei-hung, martial artist in the Qing dynasty.
 Wong Kei-ying, father of Wong Fei-hung and one of the members of the Ten Tigers of Canton.
 Donnie Yen, martial artist and actor, one of Asia's highest paid action stars.
 Bruce Lee, one of the most influential martial artists and famous actors of Asian descent of all time.
 Chan Heung, founder of Choy Li Fut

Authors 
Francis Chan, Author of the best-selling book
Clara Ng, Indonesian writer who is known for both adult fiction and children's literature.
Amy Tan, Award-winning book seller and subject of controversy
Jeffery Paul Chan, American author and scholar

Academics 
 Flossie Wong-Staal, a virologist and molecular biologist; the first scientist to clone HIV and determine the function of its genes in 1985 in 2007.The Daily Telegraph heralded Dr. Wong-Staal as No. 32 of the "Top 100 Living Geniuses."
 Chu Ching-wu, physicist and one of the first scientists to demonstrate high-temperature superconductivity, in 1987
 Choh Hao Li, Chinese-American biochemist and first scientist to synthesise human growth hormone in 1970
 Wu Ta-You, the "father of Chinese physics"
 Chan Chun Hei, Juris Doctor and pioneer of the legaltech industry
 Wu Lien-teh, physician and Nobel prize nominee, renowned for his work in public health, particularly the Manchurian plague (1910–11).
 Vivian Wing-Wah Yam, chemist known for her work on light-emitting materials and solar energy
 Albert Chan, professor of chemistry and traditional Chinese medicine
 Liang Sili, rocket and missile control system scientist
 Nancy Ip – member of the Chinese Academy of Sciences and the World Academy of Sciences
 Albert Chan (professor) – a Hong Kong professor of chemistry and traditional Chinese medicine.
 Liang Sili – Chief Designer of inertial guidance platforms for Chinese ballistic 
 Li Shaozhen  –  improve cataract surgery quality in the introduction of technology and innovation

Mathematician 
 Yum-Tong Siu – the William Elwood Byerly Professor of Mathematics at Harvard University

Other notable figures 
 Moy Lin-shin, Taoist monk and founder of International Taoist Tai Chi Society
 Feng Joe Guey, Chinese aviation pioneer
 Liang Sicheng, the "father of modern Chinese architecture"
 Dai Ailian, the "mother of Chinese modern dance"
 Lee Ya-Ching, pioneering aviator and actress
 Chang Apana A famous detective who influenced many fictional works.
 Ye Xiaogang, China's most active and most famous composers of contemporary classical music.
 Venerable Jing Run, Buddhist abbess and was known as Singapore's "grand dame of charity" in recognition of her lifelong devotion in helping the old and needy.

References

 
Lists of people by ethnicity